The Gadsden Pilots were a Minor League Baseball team based in Gadsden, Alabama, that played in the Southeastern League from 1938 to 1950 (no team was fielded from 1942 to 1945 because of World War II).

External links
Baseball Reference
Remember the Pilots

Baseball teams established in 1938
Baseball teams disestablished in 1950
Defunct minor league baseball teams
Professional baseball teams in Alabama
Defunct Southeastern League teams
Washington Senators minor league affiliates
Pittsburgh Pirates minor league affiliates
1938 establishments in Alabama
1950 disestablishments in Alabama
Southeastern League teams
Defunct baseball teams in Alabama